Melanoides nodicincta is a species of freshwater snail with a gill and an operculum, an aquatic gastropod mollusk in the family Thiaridae.

Melania simonsi E. A. Smith, 1877 / Melanoides simonsi (E. A. Smith, 1877) is considered as a synonym of Melanoides nodicincta (Dohrn, 1865), but it may be a separate species.

Distribution 
This species is endemic to Malawi. The type locality is near the southern end of the Lake Malawi and in upper part of its outlet - the Shire River.

Ecology 
Its natural habitat is freshwater lakes.

References

Fauna of Lake Malawi
Invertebrates of Malawi
Thiaridae
Gastropods described in 1865
Taxonomy articles created by Polbot
Taxobox binomials not recognized by IUCN